Lancones District is one of eight districts of the province Sullana in Peru.

References